Atlas joint may refer to:

 Atlanto-axial joint
 Atlanto-occipital joint